Camp Creek is an unincorporated community in Mercer County, West Virginia, United States. Camp Creek is located along Interstate 77 (I-77) and U.S. Route 19 (US 19), north of Princeton. Camp Creek has the ZIP code 25820.

References

Unincorporated communities in Mercer County, West Virginia
Unincorporated communities in West Virginia